María Cienfuegos Baragaño (born 8 April 2001), most commonly known as Cienfu, is a Spanish footballer who plays as a midfielder for Villarreal.

Club career
Cienfu started her career at Real Oviedo B.

References

External links
Profile at La Liga

2001 births
Living people
Women's association football midfielders
Spanish women's footballers
People from Langreo
Footballers from Asturias
Real Oviedo (women) players
Villarreal CF (women) players
Primera División (women) players
Segunda Federación (women) players